Laura H. Thielen (born March 25, 1961) is an American politician and was a Democratic member of the Hawaii Senate from 2012 to 2020 representing District 25.  Thielen served as chair of the Hawaii Department of Land and Natural Resources from 2007 to 2010 under Governor Linda Lingle.

Education
Thielen earned her BA in political science from University of Colorado and her JD from Case Western Reserve University School of Law.

Elections
2012 Thielen challenged incumbent Democratic Senator Pohai Ryan in the three-way August 11, 2012 Democratic Primary, winning with 6,236 votes (46.5%), and won the November 6, 2012 General election with 13,703 votes (57.1%) against Republican former Senator Fred Hemmings.

References

External links
Official page at the Hawaii State Legislature
Campaign site
 

1961 births
Living people
Case Western Reserve University School of Law alumni
Hawaii lawyers
Democratic Party Hawaii state senators
People from Los Angeles
Politicians from Honolulu
University of Colorado alumni
Women state legislators in Hawaii
American women lawyers
21st-century American politicians
21st-century American women politicians